HMS Unshaken (P54) was a Royal Navy U-class submarine built by Vickers-Armstrong at Barrow-in-Furness. She has been the only vessel of the Royal Navy to bear the name Unshaken.

Career
After a period operating off the coast of Norway, Unshaken spent most of her wartime career in the Mediterranean. Whilst in northern waters, on 5 July 1942, Unshaken radioed in a sighting and an exact description of a heavy German force - including the Tirpitz, Admiral Scheer and Admiral Hipper - at sea in pursuit of the ill-fated convoy PQ 17 off north Norway. Hearing of these allied sighting reports (also made by the Russian submarine K-21 and a Catalina patrol aircraft) through intelligence, Admiral Raeder cancelled the sortie, ordering the surface fleet to return to port and left the Luftwaffe and U-boats to attack the convoy. The convoy lost 24 ships out of 40, but it could have been even worse for the convoy if the heavy force had remained at sea.

Unshaken also sank the German merchant Georg L.M. Russ off southern Norway, before being reassigned to the Mediterranean in late 1942.

She also damaged the Italian tanker Dora C.. She launched unsuccessful attacks against the French merchantman Oasis, the Italian merchant vessels Pomo, Nina and Campania, and the French passenger/cargo ship Cap Corse. Unshaken had a narrow escape after she was attacked by four torpedoes launched by the Polish submarine ORP Dzik. The Poles thought they were attacking an enemy submarine, but luckily the torpedoes missed their target.

Lieutenant Commander Jack Whitton, Unshakens commander, ordered the boat to surface after her hydrophone operator reported 'high speed revs'. He then decided to board the Italian vessel as her bridge was crowded with people and could not dive quickly. A shot from the deck gun across the bows of the Italian submarine was followed by a return burst from an automatic weapon which was suppressed by machine gun fire from the British boat. Unshaken then came alongside the Menotti and able seaman Ronald "Sharky" Ward boarded the Italian vessel and secured the conning tower hatch to prevent her from diving. He was armed with a pistol, but unknown to Sharky it was unloaded, an envelope provided to the seaman when receiving his orders and the pistol contained the bullets. There followed a robust verbal exchange in which the Italian skipper wanted to go to Brindisi, whereas Whitton insisted on Malta. The situation looked as if it might turn ugly until the loaded deckgun was pointed at the Italian commander from a distance of about 13 ft (4m).

After returning to home waters in mid-1944, Unshaken sank the German merchant Asien off Lista in Norway.

Unshaken survived the war and was scrapped at Troon in March 1946.

References

 
 
 
 

 

British U-class submarines
Ships built in Barrow-in-Furness
1942 ships
World War II submarines of the United Kingdom